Jacques Coutrot (10 April 1898 – 17 September 1965) was a French fencer. He won medals in the foil competition at two Olympic Games. He was the President of the Fédération Internationale d'Escrime from 1949 to 1952.

References

External links
 

1898 births
1965 deaths
Fencers from Paris
French male foil fencers
Olympic fencers of France
Fencers at the 1924 Summer Olympics
Fencers at the 1936 Summer Olympics
Olympic gold medalists for France
Olympic silver medalists for France
Olympic medalists in fencing
Medalists at the 1924 Summer Olympics
Medalists at the 1936 Summer Olympics
Mediterranean Games bronze medalists for France
Mediterranean Games medalists in fencing
Fencers at the 1951 Mediterranean Games
20th-century French people